Thiopyran is a heterocyclic compound with the chemical formula C5H6S. There are two isomers, 2H-thiopyran and 4H-thiopyran, which differ by the location of double bonds.  Thiopyrans are analogous to pyrans in which the oxygen atoms have been replaced by sulfur atoms.

See also
 Thiopyrylium
 Thio-

References

Sulfur heterocycles
Six-membered rings